The 1995 Big South Conference men's basketball tournament took place March 3–5, 1995, at the Vines Center in Lynchburg, Virginia, the home of the Liberty Flames. For the third time in their school history, the Charleston Southern Buccaneers won the tournament, led by head coach Gary Edwards.  

Before the season, Campbell departed the Big South due to scheduling conflicts. This left the conference with just five teams having played at the Division I level for at least five years, short of the six such members required by the NCAA for a conference to receive an automatic bid into the NCAA tournament. As a result, the Big South did not have an automatic qualifier to the 1995 NCAA tournament, its first time without an auto-bid since 1990; it regained an auto-bid in 1996 and has maintained an auto-bid in every year since, as of 2021.   

Charleston Southern would receive its first NCAA tournament bid in 1997.

Format
The top eight finishers of the conference's nine teams participated in the tournament, hosted at the Vines Center. Teams were seeded by conference winning percentage. This was the last year for Towson as a member of the conference.

Bracket

* Asterisk indicates overtime game
Source

All-Tournament Team
Eric Burks, Charleston Southern
Brett Larrick, Charleston Southern
Derrick Nix, UNC Greensboro
Eric Cuthrell, UNC Greensboro
Antoine Dalton, Radford

References

Tournament
Big South Conference men's basketball tournament
Big South Conference men's basketball tournament
Big South Conference men's basketball tournament